The Ancient City of Damascus is the historic city centre of Damascus, Syria. The old city which is one of the oldest continuously inhabited cities in the world, contains numerous archaeological sites, including some historical churches and mosques. Many cultures have left their mark, especially Hellenistic, Roman, Byzantine and Islamic. In 1979, the historical center of the city, surrounded by walls of Roman era, was declared a World Heritage Site by UNESCO. In June 2013, UNESCO included all Syrian sites on the list of World Heritage in Danger to warn of the risks to which they are exposed because of the Syrian Civil War.

Origins and founding
Lying on the south bank of Barada River, the ancient city was founded in the 3rd millennium B.C. The horizontal diameter of the oval is about 1.5 km (0.9 mi) which is known as Damascus Straight Street, while the vertical diameter is about 1 km (0.6 mi). With an approximate area of 86.12 hectares (212.8 acres; 0.86 km2), the ancient city was enclosed within a historic wall of 4.5 km (2.8 mi) in circuit that was mainly built by the Romans, then fortified by the Ayyubids and Mamluks.

The first mentioning of Damascus was as "Ta-ms-qu" in the second millennium BC, it was situated in an Amorite region in the middle of a conflict zone between the Hittites and Egyptians. The city exercised tributary until the emergence of the Sea Peoples in 1200 BC whose raids helped in weakening the arch rivals. Consequently, the Semitic Arameans managed to establish the independent state of Aram-Damascus (11th century – 733 BC), naming the main city as ‘Dimashqu’ or ‘Darmeseq’.

Historical timeline

Throughout its history, Damascus has been part of the following states:

c. 2500–15th century BC, Amorites
15th century BC–late 12th century BC, New Kingdom of Egypt
late 12th century BC–732 BCE, Aram-Damascus
732 BC–609 BC, Assyria
609 BC–539 BC, Babylonia
539 BC–332 BC, Persian Achaemenid Empire
332 BC–323 BC, Macedonian Empire
323 BC–301 BC, Antigonid dynasty
301 BC–198 BC, Ptolemaic Kingdom
198 BC–167 BC, Seleucid Empire
167 BC–110 BC, Ituraea (semi-independent from Seleucids)
110 BC–85 BC, Decapolis (semi-independent from Seleucids)
85 BC–64 BC, Nabataea
64 BC–27 BC, Roman Republic
27 BC–395 AD, Roman Empire
476–608, Byzantine Empire
608–622, Sassanid Persia
622–634, Byzantine Empire (restored)
529–634, Ghassanids
634–661, Rashidun Caliphate
661–750, Umayyad Caliphate

750–885, Abbasid Caliphate
885–905, Tulunids
905–935, Abbasid Caliphate (restored)
935–969, Ikhshidids
970–973, Fatimid Caliphate
973–983, Qarmatians
983–1076, Fatimid Caliphate (restored)
1076–1104, Seljuq Empire
1104–1154, Burid dynasty
1154–1174, Zengids
1174–1260, Ayyubids
1260 March–September, Mongol Empire
1260–1521, Mamluk Sultanate
1516–1918, Ottoman Empire
1918–1920, Occupied Enemy Territory Administration
1920 March–July, Arab Kingdom of Syria
1920–1924, State of Damascus under the French Mandate
1924–1946, French Mandate of Syria
1946–1958, Syrian Republic
1958–1960, United Arab Republic
1960–present, Syrian Arab Republic

Main sights

Damascus has a wealth of historical sites dating back to many different periods of the city's history. The Citadel of Damascus is located in the northwest corner of the Old City. Today, it consists of the street of Bab Sharqi and the Souk Medhat Pasha, a covered market. The Bab Sharqi street is filled with small shops and leads to the old Christian quarter of Bab Tuma (St. Thomas's Gate). Medhat Pasha Souq is also a main market in Damascus and was named after Midhat Pasha, the Ottoman governor of Syria who renovated the Souk. At the end of the Bab Sharqi street, one reaches the House of Ananias, an underground chapel that was the cellar of Ananias's house. The Umayyad Mosque, also known as the Grand Mosque of Damascus, is one of the largest mosques in the world and also one of the oldest sites of continuous prayer since the rise of Islam. A shrine in the mosque is said to contain the body of St. John the Baptist. The mausoleum where Saladin was buried is located in the gardens just outside the mosque. Sayyidah Ruqayya Mosque, the shrine of the youngest daughter of Husayn ibn Ali, can also be found near the Umayyad Mosque. The ancient district of Amara is also within a walking distance from these sites. Another heavily visited site is Sayyidah Zaynab Mosque, where the tomb of Zaynab bint Ali is located.

Souqs and Khans

 Al-Hamidiyah Souq, built (1780–1884) during the reign of Sultan Abdul Hamid I, the largest and the central souk in Syria, located inside the old walled city of Damascus next to the Citadel. The souq is about 600 meters long and 15 meters wide, and is covered by a 10 meter tall metal arch.
 Midhat Pasha Souq, named after the then Ottoman governor of Syria (and later Grand Vizier) Midhat Pasha.
 Al-Buzuriyah Souq, 152 m (499 ft) in length.
 Khan al-Harir, completed in 1574.
 Khan Jaqmaq, completed in 1420.
 Khan As'ad Pasha, completed in 1752, covering an area of 2,500 square metres (27,000 sq ft). Situated along Al-Buzuriyah Souq, it was built and named after As'ad Pasha al-Azm.
 Khan Sulayman Pasha, completed in 1736, named after Sulayman Pasha al-Azm.

Historic buildings

 Temple of Jupiter, built by the Romans, beginning during the rule of Augustus and completed during the rule of Constantius II, previously a temple dedicated to Hadad-Ramman, the god of thunderstorms and rain.
 Damascus Straight Street, a Roman street (Decumanus Maximus) which runs from east to west in the old city, 1,500 metres in length.
 Citadel of Damascus, built (1076–1078) and (1203–1216) by Turkman warlord Atsiz ibn Uvaq, and Al-Adil I.
 Nur al-Din Bimaristan, a large medieval bimaristan ("hospital"), built and named after the Zengid Sultan Nur ad-Din in 1154.
 Mausoleum of Saladin, built in 1196, the resting place and grave of the medieval Muslim Ayyubid Sultan Saladin.
 Azm Palace, built in 1750 as a residence for the Ottoman governor of Damascus As'ad Pasha al-Azm.
 Maktab Anbar, a mid 19th-century Jewish private mansion, restored by the Ministry of Culture in 1976 to serve as a library, exhibition centre, museum and craft workshops.
 Beit al-Mamlouka, a 17th-century Damascene house, serving as a luxury boutique hotel within the old city since 2005.

Madrasas
 Al-Adiliyah Madrasa, a 13th-century madrasah.
 Al-Fathiyah Madrasa, built in 1743 by an Ottoman official named Fethi Al-Defterdar.
 Al-Mujahidiyah Madrasa, built in 1141 by Burid governor Mujahid al-Din bin Bazan bin Yammin al-Kurdu.
 Al-Qilijiyah Madrasa, established in 1254.
 Al-Salimiyah Madrasa, a 16th-century madrasah.
 Al-Sibaiyah Madrasa, established in 1515.
 Al-Zahiriyah Library, established in 1277, taking its name from its founder Sultan Baibars.
 Nur al-Din Madrasa, built in 1167 by Nūr ad-Dīn Zangī.

Places of worship

Mosques

 Sayyidah Ruqayya Mosque contains the grave of Sukayna bint Husayn, also known as Ruqayyah, the young daughter of Al-Husayn ibn ‘Alī.
 Sulaymaniyya Takiyya, the western part of which, comprising a mosque and an imaret, was commissioned by Suleiman the Magnificent and built between 1554 and 1559 to a design by Mimar Sinan; the Salimiyya Madrasa was built adjoining it in 1566 (named after Suleiman's son Selim II but possibly commissioned by Suleiman himself before his death)
 Umayyad Mosque, a mosque built on the site of Temple of Jupiter, and a Christian basilica which was dedicated to John the Baptist (Yahya). 

 Nabi Habeel Mosque
 Sinan Pasha Mosque
 Darwish Pasha Mosque
 Aqsab Mosque
 Yalbugha Mosque
 Hanabila Mosque
 Sayyidah Zaynab Mosque

Churches

 House of Saint Ananias, an ancient underground structure in Damascus, Syria, that is alleged to be the remains of the home of Ananias of Damascus, where Ananias baptized Saul (who became Paul the Apostle).
 Cathedral of the Dormition of Our Lady, also called "Greek-Melkite Patriarchal Cathedral of the Dormition of Our Lady", the Catholic cathedral of Melkite Greek Church.
 Mariamite Cathedral of Damascus, the seat of the Greek Orthodox Church of Antioch. After the Muslim conquest of Damascus the church was closed until 706 AD when al-Walid ordered to return it to the Christians as a compensation for the Church of John the Baptist which was turned into the Umayyad Mosque.
 Chapel of Saint Paul
 Cathedral of Saint George
 Syriac Catholic Cathedral of Saint Paul

Gates
The old part of the city is surrounded with 4.5-kilometre-long (2.8-mile) thick walls, pierced by the seven historical gates, the eighth gate was added later by Muslims. These are, clockwise from the north-east side:
 Bab Tuma (Gate of Thomas), dedicated to Venus.
 Bab Sharqi (The Eastern Gate), dedicated to the Sun.
 Bab Kisan (Kisan Gate), dedicated to Saturn.
 Bab al-Saghir (also called "Goristan-e-Ghariban"), dedicated to Jupiter.
 Bab al-Jabiyah (Gate of the Water Trough), dedicated to Mars.
 Bab al-Faradis (The Gate of the Paradise), dedicated to Mercury.
 Bab al-Salam (The Gate of Peace), dedicated to the Moon.
 Bab al-Faraj (The Gate of Deliverance), a gate which was built completely after the Muslim conquest of the Levant.

Hammams
The presence of public baths (ḥammāms) in Damascus started during the Umayyad era, while some historians date them back to the Roman era. The Damascene baths were mentioned by a number of Damascus historians, such as Ibn 'Asakir (1106–1175 AD) in his famous book "The History of Damascus". In his book, Ibn 'Asakir named 77 of baths working at that time within the city. The historian Ibn Shaddad counted 114 baths located in Damascus in 1250 AD.

The number of these baths increased to 365 during the Ottoman era, then decreased drastically to reach 60 baths in the late nineteenth century AD. Today, however, the number of baths in full operation is barely 20, the most famous of them is the "Nour al-Din al-Shahid" bath in the Al-Buzuriyah Souq.

Districts and subdivisions

 Al-Qaymariyya
 Al-Amarah Al-Jouwaniyah
 Al-Amin
Jewish quarter
 Bab Tuma
Al-Jourah
 Al-Hariqa
 Ma'azanat ash-Shahm
 Shaghour al-Juwani

Preservation of the ancient city

Threats to the future of the old City

Due to the rapid decline of the population of Old Damascus (between 1995 and 2009 about 30,000 people moved out of the old city for more modern accommodation), a growing number of buildings are being abandoned or are falling into disrepair. In March 2007, the local government announced that it would be demolishing Old City buildings along a  stretch of rampart walls as part of a redevelopment scheme. These factors resulted in the Old City being placed by the World Monuments Fund on its 2008 Watch List of the 100 Most Endangered Sites in the world. It is hoped that its inclusion on the list will draw more public awareness to these significant threats to the future of the historic Old City of Damascus.

Current state of old Damascus
In spite of the recommendations of the UNESCO World Heritage Center:
 Souq al-Atiq, a protected buffer zone, was destroyed in three days in November 2006;
 King Faysal Street, a traditional hand-craft region in a protected buffer zone near the walls of Old Damascus between the Citadel and Bab Touma, is threatened by a proposed motorway.
 In 2007, the Old City of Damascus and notably the district of Bab Tuma have been recognized by The World Monument Fund as one of the most endangered sites in the world.

In October 2010, Global Heritage Fund named Damascus one of 12 cultural heritage sites most "on the verge" of irreparable loss and destruction.

The old city outside of the walls of the Roman era, is also considered part of the old Damascus, however, it hasn't been given the same historical priority. During the French mandate, Michel Écochard, the French architect, planned an urban scheme for the city, that advised to only reserve the parts of the old city inside the Roman walls. This approach has been adopted later by the ruling governments of Syria, which contributed to demolishing parts of its old neighborhoods. Old houses in Sarouja, Al Midan, and Shagour Barrani was replaced by new buildings for trade mainly.

See also

Tourism in Syria
Timeline of Damascus history
List of rulers of Damascus
World Heritage Sites in Danger

References

Bibliography
 
 

Historic sites in Syria
Geography of Damascus
Neighborhoods of Damascus
World Heritage Sites in Danger
Architecture in Syria
Arabic architecture
History of Damascus